Robert B. Dickson (born January 25, 1944) is an American professional golfer who played on the PGA Tour and the Champions Tour.

Amateur career 
Dickson was born in McAlester, Oklahoma. He was introduced to golf at the age of five by his father, Ben, a club pro/manager at the McAlester Country Club, and later club pro at the Muskogee Country Club (1958–1978). He attended high school in Muskogee, and was the state 2A golf champion for three years.

Dickson attended Oklahoma State University in Stillwater, Oklahoma, where he was a two-time All-American as a member of the golf team from 1964–1966. He graduated with a Bachelor of Science degree in General Business in 1967. That year he became the first amateur golfer since 1935 to win both the U.S. Amateur and British Amateur.

Professional career 
On January 25, 1968, Dickson turned 24 years old. At his birthday party, it was announced he would turn professional. It was also announced he would enter the PGA Tour Qualifying Tournament that April for the Spring 1968 PGA Tour Qualifying School. The New York Daily News stated that "the pros rank the U.S.-British Amateur champ as a sure-pop star and the best to enter their ranks since Jack Nicklaus."

Dickson played on the PGA Tour for ten years and won two official events. During his rookie season in 1968, he won the Haig Open Invitational and the Bob Jones Award for distinguished sportsmanship in golf. His best year as a professional was 1973 when he won the Andy Williams-San Diego Open Invitational, earned $89,182, and finished in the top-30 on the money list. His best finish in a major championship was a T-17 at The Masters in 1973. 
Dickson was hired by the PGA as the Director of Marketing for the Tournament Players Club in 1979 and was also a Rules Official on the Senior PGA Tour (now known as the Champions Tour) from 1986–89. He was appointed as the Tournament Director for the Nike Tour (now known as the Web.com Tour) in 1989 and was instrumental in its initial development.

After reaching the age of 50 in January 1994, Dickson began to play on the Senior PGA Tour. His sole victory in this venue came at the 1998 Cadillac NFL Golf Classic in a playoff with Jim Colbert and Larry Nelson. He last played in a Champions Tour event in 2004.

On August 21, 2006, Dickson was inducted into the Oklahoma Sports Hall of Fame. He lives in Ponte Vedra Beach, Florida.

Amateur wins (4)
1965 Oklahoma State Amateur
1966 Oklahoma State Amateur
1967 British Amateur, U.S. Amateur

Professional wins (5)

PGA Tour wins (2)

Other wins (2)
1966 Oklahoma Open (as an amateur)
1971 Oklahoma Open

Senior PGA Tour wins (1)

Senior PGA Tour playoff record (1–0)

U.S. national team appearances
Amateur
Walker Cup: 1967 (winners)
Americas Cup: 1967 (winners)

See also 

 Spring 1968 PGA Tour Qualifying School graduates

References

External links

American male golfers
Oklahoma State Cowboys golfers
PGA Tour golfers
PGA Tour Champions golfers
Golfers from Oklahoma
Golfers from Florida
People from McAlester, Oklahoma
People from Ponte Vedra Beach, Florida
1944 births
Living people